Smuggling Booze in the Graveyard is an album by American rapper and Wu-Tang Clan affiliate Warcloud, originally released in 2002 as a CD-R by the Skarekrow Music label. It was remastered and reissued in 2006 with an exclusive bonus track.

Production was handled largely by The Skarekrow, with two beats each by Wu-Tang Clan's RZA and Wu-Tang affiliate Cilvaringz, and one each from affiliates 4th Disciple and ShoGun Assason. Guest vocal appearances were made by Wu-Tang affiliates Black Knights and ShoGun Assason, as well as by JulesUnique, Vulgar, The Skarekrow and Soul Brady. The bonus track on the reissued version, "Bloodline", also featured appearances by Leviathan and Black Sun (a.k.a. Onslawt).

Track listing
"Intro Dark Choozer: Grave Roller Coaster Tycoon (One Standard Lesson)"
Featuring JulesUnique
Produced by The Skarekrow
"Smuggling Booze in the Graveyard"
Featuring JulesUnique
Produced by The Skarekrow
"The Trap Door"
Featuring JulesUnique
Produced by The RZA
"Castle Freak of Bone Romania"
Produced by The Skarekrow
"The Mighty King of Swords"
Produced by 4th Disciple
"The Last Hovering Castle"
Produced by Cilvaringz
"Battleship Starship Warcloud Shake'spear Cliff"
Featuring JulesUnique
Produced by The Skarekrow
"9 Days of Wine & Roses"
Produced by The Skarekrow
"Shuffle Heavy Gun-Powder-Keg"
Featuring the professional
Produced by The Skarekrow
"Lost Soldier of Wu-Tang"
Produced by The RZA
"Raw Head Spear Howling Wolves/Royal Rumble"
Featuring Black Knights & ShoGun Assason
Produced by ShoGun Assason
"Vampire Kung-Fu"
Produced by The Skarekrow
"Sleepwalker Drive-In Theatre"
Featuring Vulgar & The Skarekrow
Produced by The Skarekrow
"MoJo-oodoov: The Dead Man & His Stepson"
Produced by The Skarekrow
"On the High Side of the Sky"
Featuring Soul Brady
Produced by The Skarekrow
"Angry Men from the Graveyard"
Featuring The Skarekrow & Vulgar
Produced by The Skarekrow
"Weapon Factory Outro: Gun-Low-Stance"
Produced by Cilvaringz
"Bloodline" (bonus)
Featuring Leviathan and Black Sun a.k.a. Onslawt
Produced by The Skarekrow

References

Albums produced by 4th Disciple
2002 albums
Warcloud albums
Albums produced by Cilvaringz